Crossplot is a 1969 British neo noir crime film starring Roger Moore. Belgian actress Claudie Lange was also featured in her largest English-speaking role.

Plot
Roger Moore is Gary Fenn, a talent scout for a London modelling agency who finds the perfect target and calculates the events which mean that only one girl will be good enough for his bosses, a Hungarian Marla Kugash (Lange). He finds her among the anti-war movement in the bohemian depths of swinging London. She is in the company of a young man, Tarquin, who is extremely protective of her and overtly aggressive to Fenn.

The young Hungarian, an illegal refugee from her native homeland, accompanies Fenn to a photoshoot. However, she admits she is in fear of her life, and seems disturbed by the presence of her aunt. When she is nearly killed, the girl drops out of sight and Fenn has to go on the run himself, suspected of a separate murder. He locates her to a country house, which turns out to be the home of Tarquin, an aristocrat in spite of his anti-war sentiments.

It is revealed that Marla's aunt is part of a shadowy organisation trying to destabilise the existing world order so they can take over themselves. They will go to any length to try and shut Fenn and Marla up, including sending a helicopter after them. Fenn and his friend manage to escape to London, where they realise that the shadowy movement are planning to assassinate a visiting African head of state in Hyde Park. They manage to foil the plot.

Cast
 Roger Moore as Gary Fenn 
 Claudie Lange as Marla Kugash
 Martha Hyer as Jo Grinling
 Alexis Kanner as Tarquin   
 Derek Francis as Sir Charles Moberley 
 Ursula Howells as Maggi Thwaites 
 Bernard Lee as Chilmore 
 Francis Matthews as Ruddock 
 Dudley Sutton as Warren 
 Mona Bruce as Myrna 
 Veronica Carlson as Dinah 
 Michael Culver as Jim 
 Gabrielle Drake as Celia 
 Tim Preece as Sebastian 
 Norman Eshley as Athol
 Michael Robbins as Garage Attendant
 John Barrard as Wedding Guest
 David Prowse as Best man
 Les Conrad as Tugboat Captain

Reception

The film is not particularly well regarded by critics. One suggested that the film quickly became "tedious" in spite of the numerous action sequences, and the plot was far too "convoluted" and "confusing".

References

External links
 
 

1969 films
British spy films
Films shot at Associated British Studios
1960s English-language films
Films directed by Alvin Rakoff
1960s British films